The region around the city of Rotorua, in New Zealand's North Island, contains several lakes. From biggest to smallest, these are Lake Rotorua (Second Lake), Lake Tarawera, Lake Rotoiti (Small Lake), Lake Rotoma (White Lake), Lake Okataina, Lake Rotoehu (Muddy Lake), Lake Rotomahana (Warm Lake), Lake Rerewhakaaitu, Lake Rotokakahi (Green Lake), Lake Okareka and Lake Tikitapu (Blue lake). There are also four smaller lakes: Lake Okaro/Ngakaro, Lake Rotokawa (not to be confused with Lake Rotokawa near Taupo), Lake Rotokawau and Lake Rotongata (Mirror Lake). Most of the lakes have formed due to volcanic activity. The region is part of the Taupo Volcanic Zone, the world's most active area of explosive silicic volcanic activity in geologically recent time.

Geographic statistics

Lake Rotorua

Lake Rotorua is the largest of the lakes with Lake Tarawera close behind, it is also the second largest lake in the North Island by surface area and covers 79.8 square kilometers. With a main depth of only 10 metres it is smaller than Lake Tarawera by water volume. The lake lies within a large volcanic caldera in the Taupo Volcanic Zone. After an eruption, the magma chamber underneath the volcano collapsed. The depression left behind is the Rotorua Caldera. Mokoia Island, is close to the middle of the lake and is the setting for the legendary tale of Hinemoa and Tutanekai.

Lake Tarawera

Lake Tarawera is the second largest lake in the rotorua caldera with a surface area of 51.0 km². It is filled by sources from the nearby Blue and Green lakes (or Lake Rotokakahi and Lake Tikitapu). Lake Tarawera is home to various eels and rainbow trout. During the summer the lake is popular for both fishing and water sports, and also camping as there a number of hot water beaches. Lake Tarawera's outflow is at its north end, into the Tarawera River, which flows further into the Pacific Ocean.

Lake Rotoiti

Lake Rotoiti is the third largest lake in the Bay of Plenty region of New Zealand. It is the westernmost in a chain of lakes formed within the Okataina caldera. The lake is close to the northern shore of its most famous neighbour, Lake Rotorua, and is connected by the Ohau Channel. The Māori-language name "Rotoiti" means "the little lake". The lake covers an area of 38.6 square kilometres.

Lake Rotoma

Lake Rotoma is the fourth largest lake in the Bay of Planty region of New Zealand. It is the easternmost lake in a chain of three lakes to the northeast of Lake Rotorua in New Zealand's North Island. The others are Lake Rotoiti and Lake Rotoehu. Lake Rotoma formed within the Rotoma caldera after lava flows blocked its outlet 10,000 years ago. It is located exactly half-way between the city of Rotorua and town of Whakatane. The lake covers an area of 11.8 square kilometres.

Lake Okataina

Lake Okataina is the largest of four smaller lakes lying between Lake Rotorua and Lake Tarawera in the Bay of Plenty region of New Zealand's North Island. The others are Lake Rotokakahi (Green Lake), Lake Tikitapu (Blue Lake), and Lake Okareka. Unlike many other lakes in the region, Lake Okataina is completely encircled by native forest. It also has no inlets or outlets. Over the past 30 years, the level of the lake has risen about 5 metres. The lake covers an area of 10.8 square kilometres.

Lake Rotoehu

Lake Rotoehu is the smallest lake in a chain of three lakes near Lake Rotorua in New Zealand's North Island. It is located between the city of Rotorua and town of Whakatane. It is fed by Lake Rotoma to the east, and flows westward joining Lake Rotoiti. The lake is one of the least visited, but offers great Kayaking and fishing (rainbow trout). The lake covers an area of 8.1 square kilometres.

Lake Rotomahana

Lake Rotomahana is a small lake in northern New Zealand, located 25 kilometres to the east of Rotorua. It is immediately southwest of the volcano Mount Tarawera, and its geography was substantially altered by a major eruption in 1886. The lake covers a surface area of 8.0 square kilometres.

Pink and White Terraces
The Pink and White Terraces were a natural wonder located on the shores of the lake. They were considered to be the eighth wonder of the natural world and were New Zealand's most famous tourist attraction during the mid 19th century. They were considered lost in the Mount Tarawera eruption on 10 June 1886 until in 2016 a forgotten survey was rediscovered in Switzerland. This recently enabled researchers to reestablish the Pink and White Terrace locations which proved to lie on land; raising the possibility the sites may be investigated  and any surviving sections of the terraces recovered or made open to public view.

Lake Rerewhakaaitu

Lake Rerewhakaaitu is a small, shallow lake in northern New Zealand, located 30 kilometres to the east of Rotorua. It is immediately south of the active volcano Mount Tarawera, and its geography was substantially altered by the 1886 eruption. The lake covers a surface area of 7.4 square kilometres.

Lake Rotokakahi (Green Lake)

Lake Rotokakahi or Green Lake, is one of four small lakes lying between Lake Rotorua and Lake Tarawera in the Bay of Plenty region of New Zealand's North Island. The others are Lake Tikitapu (Blue Lake), Lake Okareka, and Lake Okataina. Named by the Māori for its abundance of shellfish, it flows to Lake Tarawera via the Te Wairoa waterfalls. It appears emerald green from the air due to its shallow, sandy bottom. The lake is 1302 feet above sea level and 69 feet below the level of the neighbouring Lake Tikitapu. The lake is largely undisturbed due to no nearby roads or towns. The lake covers a surface area of 4.5 square kilometres.

Lake Okareka

Lake Okareka is one of four small lakes lying between Lake Rotorua and Lake Tarawera, in the Bay of Plenty region of New Zealand's North Island. The others are Lake Rotokakahi (Green Lake), Lake Tikitapu (Blue Lake), and Lake Okataina. This lake has an adjacent settlement of approximately 600 people. The lake covers a surface area of 3.5 square kilometres.

Lake Tikitapu (Blue Lake)

Lake Tikitapu or Blue Lake, is the smallest of four small lakes lying between Lake Rotorua and Lake Tarawera in the Bay of Plenty region of New Zealand's North Island. The others are Lake Rotokakahi (Green Lake), Lake Okareka, and Lake Okataina. Along with the others, Lake Tikitapu lies within a volcanic caldera formed within the last 300,000 years. The blue colour of the lake can be attributed to rhyolite and pumice on the lake bed. The lake has no visible outlet, however subsurface flow drains towards Lake Tarawera. The lake has a surface area of 1.4 square kilometres.

References

Rotorua Lakes District
Rotorua
Rotorua